This is a list of notable events in country music that took place in the year 1989.

Events
 May 9 – Rising country star Keith Whitley is found dead at his home, a victim of alcohol poisoning. News of his death sent shockwaves through the industry, given that he had been hailed as a future superstar who helped bring neotraditionalism to the forefront during the 1980s. His widow, Lorrie Morgan, would become a major superstar after his death.

No dates
 1989 was one of two years during the 1980s which sprouted the most prolific class of newcomers in country music history (1986 being the other), a trend that had not been seen since the mid-1950s (when artists such as Elvis Presley, George Jones and Johnny Cash first rose to fame). Clint Black was at the head of the class early on, given that he had two of the year's most memorable singles – "A Better Man" and "Killin' Time" – and one of the most critically acclaimed albums of the year (Killin' Time), and was already selling out shows nationwide. Garth Brooks, however, proved to be the 1989 newcomer that stood head and shoulders above everyone else, eventually selling millions of albums, taking worldwide tours and creating some of the most influential music of the 1990s and beyond.
Another newcomer, Alan Jackson, had a minor hit with his first release in the autumn of that year with "Blue Blooded Woman;" future singles – all featuring the neotraditional style, would do considerably better, to say the least. Travis Tritt contributed with his brand of rock-influenced country, while Lorrie Morgan (daughter of Grand Ole Opry legend George Morgan) became a star in her own right following the alcohol-poisoning death of her husband, Keith Whitley.
Other top newcomers of the year were Suzy Bogguss, and Lionel Cartwright.

Top hits of the year

Singles released by American artists

Singles released by Canadian artists

Top new album releases

Other top albums

On television

Regular series
 Hee Haw (1969–1993, syndicated)

Specials

Births
 January 30 - Devin Dawson, country singer-songwriter known for his 2018 hit "All on Me".
 March 10 – Rachel Reinert, member of Gloriana.
 March 20 – Lindsay Ell, Canadian country singer of the 2010s.
 August 28 – Cassadee Pope, lead singer of pop rock band Hey Monday, turned country singer; winner of the third season of The Voice
 December 13 – Taylor Swift, teen star who quickly enjoyed major crossover success by the end of the 2000s decade.

Deaths
 February 4 – Kenneth C. "Jethro" Burns, 68, of the Homer and Jethro comedy duo.
 March 8 – Stuart Hamblen, 80, one of radio's first country music superstars, whose later works reflected his religious convictions.
 May 9 – Keith Whitley, 33, honky tonk-styled singer who rose to fame in the mid-1980s (alcohol poisoning)
 August 25 – Al Cherney, 56, Albertan fiddler
 September 23 – Bradley Kincaid, 94, Singer and Guitarist who started his career in 1927 in Chicago over WLS Radio, performing the traditional mountain ballads he had learned during his boyhood in Kentucky, he soon became the genre's first Multimedia superstar. He collected, recorded, and published many of the old Folk ballads, thereby preserving them for posterity. (Automobile Accident).

Hall of Fame inductees

Country Music Hall of Fame inductees
Jack Stapp (1912–1980)
Cliffie Stone (1917–1998)
Hank Thompson (1925–2007)

Canadian Country Music Hall of Fame inductees
Charlie Chamberlain
Al Cherney (posthumous)
King Ganam
Dallas Harms
Earl Heywood
Marg Osburne
Ian Tyson
Mercey Brothers
Maurice Bolyer
Don Grashey
Maurice Bolyer

Major awards

Grammy Awards
Best Female Country Vocal Performance – Absolute Torch and Twang, k.d. lang
Best Male Country Vocal Performance – Lyle Lovett and His Large Band, Lyle Lovett
Best Country Performance by a Duo or Group with Vocal – Will the Circle Be Unbroken: Volume Two, Nitty Gritty Dirt Band
Best Country Collaboration with Vocals – "There's a Tear in My Beer", Hank Williams and Hank Williams, Jr.
Best Country Instrumental Performance – "Amazing Grace", Randy Scruggs
Best Country Song – "After All This Time", Rodney Crowell
Best Bluegrass Recording – "The Valley Road", Nitty Gritty Dirt Band and Bruce Hornsby

Juno Awards
Country Male Vocalist of the Year – George Fox
Country Female Vocalist of the Year – k.d. lang
Country Group or Duo of the Year – Family Brown

Academy of Country Music
Entertainer of the Year – George Strait
Song of the Year – "Where've You Been", Jon Vezner and Don Henry (Performer: Kathy Mattea)
Single of the Year – "A Better Man", Clint Black
Album of the Year – Killin' Time, Clint Black
Top Male Vocalist – Clint Black
Top Female Vocalist – Kathy Mattea
Top Vocal Duo – The Judds
Top Vocal Group – Restless Heart
Top New Male Vocalist – Clint Black
Top New Female Vocalist – Mary Chapin Carpenter
Top New Vocal Duo or Group – The Kentucky Headhunters
Video of the Year – "There's a Tear in My Beer", Hank Williams, Jr. and Hank Williams (Director: Ethan Russell)

ARIA Awards 
(presented in Sydney on March 6, 1989)
Best Country Album – Boomerang Café (John Williamson)

Canadian Country Music Association
Entertainer Artist of the Year – k.d. lang
Male Artist of the Year – Gary Fjellgaard
Female Artist of the Year – k.d. lang
Group of the Year – Family Brown
SOCAN Song of the Year – "Town of Tears", Barry Brown, Randall Prescott, Bruce Campbell (Performer: Family Brown)
Single of the Year – "Town of Tears", Family Brown
Album of the Year – Shadowland, k.d. lang
Top Selling Album – Old 8×10, Randy Travis
Vista Rising Star Award – George Fox
Duo of the Year – Gary Fjellgaard and Linda Kidder

Country Music Association
Entertainer of the Year – George Strait
Song of the Year – "Chiseled in Stone", Max D. Barnes and Vern Gosdin (Performer: Vern Gosdin)
Single of the Year – "I'm No Stranger to the Rain", Keith Whitley
Album of the Year – Will the Circle Be Unbroken: Volume Two, Nitty Gritty Dirt Band
Male Vocalist of the Year – Ricky Van Shelton
Female Vocalist of the Year – Kathy Mattea
Vocal Duo of the Year – The Judds
Vocal Group of the Year – Highway 101
Horizon Award – Clint Black
Music Video of the Year – "There's a Tear in My Beer", Hank Williams, Jr. and Hank Williams (Director: Ethan Russell)
Vocal Event of the Year – Hank Williams, Jr. and Hank Williams
Musician of the Year – Johnny Gimble

Further reading
Kingsbury, Paul, "The Grand Ole Opry: History of Country Music. 70 Years of the Songs, the Stars and the Stories," Villard Books, Random House; Opryland USA, 1995
Kingsbury, Paul, "Vinyl Hayride: Country Music Album Covers 1947–1989," Country Music Foundation, 2003
Millard, Bob, "Country Music: 70 Years of America's Favorite Music," HarperCollins, New York, 1993
Whitburn, Joel, "Top Country Songs 1944–2005 – 6th Edition." 2005.

Other links
Country Music Association
Inductees of the Country Music Hall of Fame

External links
Country Music Hall of Fame

Country
Country music by year